Free Your Mind is an award granted by MTV during its shows in order to award actions or promotion towards social ethics such as human right protection, political and civil law enforcement or environmental protection. The awards are given to non-governmental organizations as well as individuals. The granted award is also provided financial assistance and campaign promotion on MTV's channels.

MTV Europe Music Awards

MTV Australia Awards

MTV Russia Music Awards

MTV Romania Music Awards 

Human rights awards
Activism
MTV Europe Music Awards
MTV Australia Awards